New London may refer to:

Places

United States
New London, Alabama
New London, Connecticut
New London, Indiana
New London, Iowa
New London, Maryland
New London, Minnesota
New London, Missouri
New London, New Hampshire, a New England town
New London (CDP), New Hampshire, the central village in the town
New London, North Carolina
New London, Ohio
New London, Pennsylvania
New London, Texas
New London, Virginia
New London, Caroline County, Virginia
New London, Wisconsin
New London County, Connecticut
New London Township (disambiguation)

Elsewhere
New London, original name of St. George's, Bermuda
New London, Prince Edward Island, Canada

Transportation
New London Airport (Virginia), U.S.
Groton–New London Airport, Connecticut, U.S.

Other uses
New London Orchestra, London, England
New London Theatre, now Gillian Lynne Theatre, London, England
USS New London (1859), a Union Navy steamer
USS New London County, a U.S. Navy tank landing ship

See also
New England (disambiguation)
New Britain (disambiguation)
Kelo v. City of New London, a 2005 U.S. Supreme Court case